Celaenorrhinus macrostictus is a species of butterfly in the family Hesperiidae. It is found in Gabon, the Democratic Republic of the Congo, Uganda and western Kenya. The habitat consists of forests.

References

Butterflies described in 1893
macrostictus
Butterflies of Africa